Henley on Klip is a town in Midvaal Local Municipality in Gauteng, South Africa. It is situated next to Highbury off exit 27 on the R59 along the Klip River between Johannesburg and Vereeniging.

History
The village was founded in 1904, by Advocate Horace Kent. Born in 1855 in Henley on Thames, England, Kent came to South Africa in 1898. The area where Henley on Klip is located reminded Kent of his hometown in England, Henley on Thames.

In 1904, the SFC decided to build the Kidson Weir on the Klip River in Henley on Klip. The weir was named after Fenning Kidson, the grandson of an
1820 settler. Fenning was educated in England, but returned to South Africa
as a young man and became a transport rider, a contemporary of Sir Percy
Fitzpatrick. Soon after the outbreak of the Anglo Boer War, news came to
Kidson that a commando was on his way to his farm to arrest him. Under the
noses of the Boers he escaped, riding sidesaddle, his burly frame crammed
into his wife's riding habit. He finally made his way to Natal, but
returned to the Transvaal after the war, settling in Henley on Klip with his
wife, Edith. The family home was named Tilham, which is the manor house on
the river at the corner of Regatta and Shillingford Roads

Community organisations
 Henley on Klip Community Policing Forum
 Henley Watch
 Lions Club
 Rotary Club
 Henley Performing Arts
 First Henley Scouts
 Henley @ Heart
 Henley Soup Souls

Schools
There are four schools and home schooling tutor centres in the village.
 Oprah Winfrey Leadership Academy for Girls 
 Henley Primary School
 Assemblies of God (AOG) College
 Hope Christian Academy
 Orchards Academy (Impaq Centre)
Nicholas Bhengu Theological College (A non-denominational college established in 1991 and named after Reverend Nicholas Hepworth Bhengu of the Assemblies of God is headquartered in the Assemblies of God Conference Center, Henley on Klip)

1970 bus accident
At 14:15 on 28 January 1970, a schoolbus stalled on a level crossing and was hit by a passenger train; 23 children were killed and 16 were injured. Johan le Roux, a matric scholar at Dr Malan Hoerskool in Meyerton, saved two children by pushing them out of a bus window before the train hit the bus, and he died in the accident.

Notable people
Kai Luke Brümmer, actor

References

External links
Midvaal Local Municipality
Vaal Triangle Info
Oprah Winfrey Leadership Academy Foundation
 Vaalmeander
90.6FM - The Vaal's Hit Station
Henley High & Preparatory School
Henley Watch
HENLEY-ON-KLIP

 
Populated places in the Midvaal Local Municipality